Tecmo NBA Basketball is a basketball video game that was released by Tecmo for the Nintendo Entertainment System.

Like Tecmo Super Bowl and Tecmo Bowl before it, the game features cinema-style cutscenes during gameplay. There is an option to play an all-star game, but unlike with Tecmo Super Bowl, there is no option to select the players on the All-Star teams. Tecmo also released a version of the game for the Super NES and Genesis, titled Tecmo Super NBA Basketball. This is the first basketball video game to feature an official license from both the NBA and the NBPA players union (however, it was not the first basketball video game to have a license from the NBA; that distinction went to Intellivision's NBA Basketball in 1980).

The game features an appearance from Michael Jordan and all current NBA teams and players from the 1991–92 NBA season. The Los Angeles Lakers team features Magic Johnson despite his not actually playing in the NBA during that season (he had announced his retirement early in the season, having never played a game in the 1991–92 season).

References

1992 video games
National Basketball Association video games
Nintendo Entertainment System games
Nintendo Entertainment System-only games
North America-exclusive video games
Koei Tecmo franchises
Tecmo games
Video games scored by George Sanger
Video games developed in the United States
Video games set in 1991
Video games set in 1992
Multiplayer and single-player video games